Celtis spinosa is a species of flowering plant in the family Cannabaceae, native to seasonally dry tropical South America.

References

spinosa
Flora of Venezuela
Flora of West-Central Brazil
Flora of Northeast Brazil
Flora of Southeast Brazil
Flora of South Brazil
Flora of Paraguay
Flora of Northeast Argentina
Flora of Northwest Argentina
Flora of Uruguay
Plants described in 1824